Merete Myklebust (born 16 May 1973 in Ålesund) is a former Norwegian footballer, world champion, and olympic medalist.

She debuted for the Norwegian national team in 1993 and played 60 matches for the national team.

She received a bronze medal at the 1996 Summer Olympics in Atlanta.

References

External links

1973 births
Living people
Norwegian women's footballers
Footballers at the 1996 Summer Olympics
Olympic footballers of Norway
Olympic bronze medalists for Norway
Olympic medalists in football
1995 FIFA Women's World Cup players
FIFA Women's World Cup-winning players
Toppserien players
Spjelkavik IL players
SK Trondheims-Ørn players
Medalists at the 1996 Summer Olympics
Norway women's international footballers
Women's association footballers not categorized by position
Sportspeople from Ålesund